is a railway station located in the town of Happō, Akita Prefecture, Japan, operated by East Japan Railway Company (JR East).

Lines
Hachimori Station  is served by the  Gonō Line, and is located 22.7 kilometers from the southern terminus of the line at Higashi-Noshiro Station.

Station layout
The station has a single island platform; however, only one side of the platform is in use, serving bidirectional traffic. The unattended station is managed from Noshiro Station.

Platforms

History
The JGR became the JNR (Japan National Railways) after World War II. The station was renamed to its present name on November 1, 1959. A new station building was completed in 1985. With the privatization of the JNR on April 1, 1987, the station has been managed by JR East. The station has been unattended since 1990.

Surrounding area
Hachimori Elementary School
Hachimori Post Office

See also
List of railway stations in Japan

References

External links

 JR East station information page 

Railway stations in Japan opened in 1926
Railway stations in Akita Prefecture
Gonō Line
Happō, Akita